The Morningside Nature Preserve is a project initiated by the Wildwood Urban Forest Committee to stop the destruction of  of forest located in northeast Atlanta and to develop this land for leisure and educational uses, but in a way that is consistent with conservation principles, including protection of water resources and native vegetation.

References

External links
YouTube video 2:45 in length
Discover the Creek - a non-profit project founded by the Southfork Conservancy

Georgia
Geography of Atlanta
Protected areas of Fulton County, Georgia